A Cabinet Manual is a government document which sets out the main laws, rules and conventions affecting the conduct and operation of the government.

Cabinet Manuals
 Cabinet Manual (New Zealand)
 Cabinet Manual (United Kingdom)

Government documents